Palomo ("dove"; after the shape of its glaciers) is a  high Chilean stratovolcano located in the commune of Machali, Cachapoal province, Libertador General Bernardo O'Higgins Region, west of Caldera del Atuel. Together with Tinguiririca it is one of two volcanoes in the region with evidence of Holocene volcanism. The volcano is remote and knowledge on its geology and potential volcanic hazards is limited.

The edifice of the volcano is irregular and various estimates of its volume exist, ranging . The best estimate is considered to be . Andrés is constructed on a granitoid basement that slopes into the valley of Rio Cortaderal, and its name relates to the son of Reynaldo Charrier, a geologist who described the subsidiary centre in 2010 and who hoped that his son would one day also know the mountain range. It and Palomo are located on the El Diablo fault; a number of other volcanoes and geothermal manifestations are located along its trace, which separates Mesozoic and Cenozoic geological formations.

The volcano is flanked by glaciers. 
Several of these sizeable glaciers form the Rio Blanco, Rio Cortaderal and Rio de los Cipreses on the northern flank, which drain into the Cachapoal River. A thermal event in the volcano in 1847 caused a meltwater flood on the Cachapoal River. The southern slope features the  Universidad Glacier, which forms the Rio San Andrés which drains into the Tinguiririrca River.

The edifice is mainly constructed by lava flows that bury parts of the calderas in the foot of the volcano. Palomo has erupted andesite and dacite, as well as basaltic andesite. All rocks are calc-alkaline rocks of medium potassium content. The main edifice rocks contain abundant phenocrysts dominated by plagioclase; clinopyroxene, orthopyroxene and other minerals are less prevalent. The Andrés edifice has a distinct composition, with more amphibole and olivine and less plagioclase than the main edifice.

Argon–argon dating has been used to date the rocks erupted by Palomo. The main summit yielded dates of 100,000 ± 40,000 years ago, while postglacial lavas of Andrés are dated at 40,000 ± 30,000 years ago, but volcanic activity at Palomo may have continued into pre-Hispanic times. A flood in the Cachapoal Valley in 1847 may have been triggered by a geothermal event on the Palomo volcano. Future activity at Palomo might generate lahars through the melting of ice, which could affect the valleys of the rivers draining the volcano.

See also
 List of volcanoes in Chile
 List of mountains in the Andes

References

External links
 Cordón Granito – Topos (including Agujas del Palomo)
 AVA of Palomo

Volcanoes of O'Higgins Region
Mountains of Chile
Stratovolcanoes of Chile
Pleistocene stratovolcanoes